JTLS may refer to:

 Joint Technical Language Service, a British translation service
 Joint Theater Level Simulation, a civil/military and humanitarian assistance/disaster relief simulation